Roberto Accornero (born 9 March 1957) is an Italian television, film and voice actor.

In the several roles he played, there was that of father Angelo Dell'Acqua in the miniseries John XXIII: The Pope of Peace, and that of captain Aloisi in the series Il maresciallo Rocca.

Film 
 Il diavolo sulle colline, dir. Vittorio Cottafavi (1985)
 The Two Lives of Mattia Pascal, dir. Mario Monicelli (1985)
 Remake, dir. Ansano Giannarelli (1987)
 The Peaceful Air of the West, dir. Silvio Soldini (1990)
 Who Killed Pasolini?, dir. Marco Tullio Giordana (1995)
 We All Fall Down, dir. Davide Ferrario (1997)
 L'educazione di Giulio, dir. Claudio Bondi (2000)
 Sleepless, dir. Dario Argento (2001)
 It Can't Be All Our Fault, dir. Carlo Verdone (2003)
 The Best of Youth, dir. Marco Tullio Giordana (2003)
 The Voyage Home, dir. Claudio Bondi (2004)
 I giorni dell'abbandono, dir. Roberto Faenza (2005)
 The Double Hour, dir. Giuseppe Capotondi (2009)
 I, Don Giovanni, dir. Carlos Saura (2009)
 Noi credevamo, dir. Mario Martone (2010)
 The Dinner, dir. Ivano De Matteo (2014)

Dubbing roles

Animation 
 Narrator in X-Men: Pryde of the X-Men
 Fox in The Gruffalo
 Fox in The Gruffalo's Child
 Kizashi Haruno in Road to Ninja: Naruto the Movie
 Kizashi Haruno in Road to Ninja: Naruto the Movie
 Brain in Top Cat: The Movie
 Brain in Top Cat Begins

Live action 
 Adam Zarrow in Anesthesia 
 Nickels in The Devil's Tomb
 Mika in The Captive
 Dr. Christian Keedler in Lucky
 Dr. Reinhard Winkler in 1001 Grams
 Ray Warding in Lying and Stealing
 Denis Goldberg in Escape from Pretoria 
 Bill Seidel in The Mauritanian

Radio 
 Sam Torpedo (2001) – radio drama – Radio 3
 La fabbrica di polli (2008) – radio drama – Radio 3

References

External links 

 

1957 births
Living people
Italian male television actors
Italian male film actors
Italian male voice actors
People from Ivrea